The Demis Roussos Magic is a studio album by Greek singer Demis Roussos, released in 1977 on Philips Records.

Commercial performance 
The album reached no. 29 in the UK.

Track listing 
All tracks arranged and produced by Vangelis Papathanassiou, except "When Forever Has Gone" produced by Peter Sullivan.

Charts

Certifications

References

External links 
 Demis Roussos – The Demis Roussos Magic at Discogs
 Demis Roussos – The Demis Roussos Magic (Vinyl, LP, Album) at Discogs

1977 albums
Demis Roussos albums
Philips Records albums
Mercury Records albums
Albums produced by Vangelis